Max Mirnyi and Nenad Zimonjić were the defending champions, but did not participate together this year.  Mirnyi partnered Mark Knowles, losing in the semifinals.  Zimonjić partnered Brian MacPhie and successfully defended his title.

Macphie and Zimonjić won in the final 7–5, 6–4, against Joshua Eagle and Andrew Florent.

Seeds

Draw

Draw

External links
Draw

Delray Beach Open
2000 ATP Tour
2000 Citrix Tennis Championships